Nora Berend is a Fellow of St Catharine's College, Cambridge and Professor of European History at the Faculty of History.

Her book At the Gate of Christendom was awarded the Gladstone Prize.

Selected publications 

Berend, Nora, ed. (2012), The Expansion of Central Europe in the Middle Ages. London: Routledge.

References

External links 

 "Baltic Crusades", BBC Radio 4, In Our Time link. Nora Berend on the panel with Aleks Pluskowski and Martin Palmer.

Fellows of St Catharine's College, Cambridge
21st-century Hungarian historians
Hungarian women historians